The 1951 season was the fortieth season for Santos FC.

References

External links
Official Site 

Santos
1951
1951 in Brazilian football